Vivian van Huiden (born August 1, 1990, Amstelveen) is a Dutch voice actress.

Filmography

Voice acting roles 
Phineas and Ferb (TV series) - Isabella
The Powerpuff Girls (TV series, 2016) - Princess Morbucks
Angelo Rules (TV series) - Lola
Lilo & Stitch - Lilo
Die Wilden Hühner - Sprotte
Descendants - Princess Audrey
Descendants 3 - Princess Audrey

Screen roles 
  Snuf de hond (TV series) (2008) - Mirjam Weisman
  Penny's Shadow (2011) - Chantal

References

External links

1990 births
Living people
Dutch voice actresses
People from Amstelveen